A Case of Murder is a 2004 action/crime/thriller film which had its release in South Africa on 2 July 2004.

It was based on a true story of a hideous murder, where the victim's body was disposed of in a suitcase.

The film was dedicated to the memory of veteran actor Ramalao Makhene, who died shortly after shooting was completed.

Plot
Two brothers, together with one of their wives, plot to kill the old man they live with and steal his pension. When they try to dispose of the body, things start to go horribly wrong.

Cast
Steve Hofmeyr as Jack Norkem
Candice Hillebrand as Colleen Norkem
Gideon Emery as Eric Norkem
Anthony Fridjohn as Uncle Angel
Ben Kruger as Bushy
Ramolao Makhene as Alpheus
Clare Marshall as Gerty
Nicky Rebello as Sergeant Corrie

References

External links
Official Website

2004 films
2000s thriller films
South African thriller films
2000s English-language films
English-language South African films
English-language thriller films